Briartite is an opaque iron-grey metallic sulfide mineral,  with traces of Ga and Sn, found as inclusions in other germanium-gallium-bearing sulfides.

It was discovered at the Prince Léopold Mine, Kipushi, Shaba, Congo (Léopoldville) in 1965 by Francotte and others, and named for Gaston Briart who had studied formations at Kipushi.

Briartite is also found in Namibia, Greece, and Spain.

See also
 List of minerals
 List of minerals named after people

References

Copper minerals
Zinc minerals
Iron(II) minerals
Germanium minerals
Sulfide minerals
Tetragonal minerals
Minerals in space group 121
Minerals described in 1965